Tunku Alif Hussein Saifuddin Al-Amin ibni Tuanku Muhriz (3 September 1984 – 15 January 2016), was the third son of the reigning Yang di-Pertuan Besar of Negeri Sembilan, Tuanku Muhriz ibni Almarhum Tuanku Munawir.

Family 
Tunku Alif Hussein was born on 3 September 1984 at the General Hospital, Kuala Lumpur, as third son and child of Tuanku Muhriz ibni Almarhum Tuanku Munawir (now the reigning Yang di-Pertuan Besar of Negeri Sembilan) and Tuanku Aishah Rohani.

His siblings are :
 Tunku Ali Redhauddin, Tunku Besar of Seri Menanti (born 26 April 1977).
 Tunku Zain Al-'Abidin (born 6 July 1982).

Education
He was educated at The Institutes for the Achievement of Human Potential (IAHP), Philadelphia, Pennsylvania, United States.

Death
Tunku Aliff died on 15 January 2016 at Hospital Canselor Tuanku Muhriz in Kuala Lumpur following an illness. He was 31 years old. He was laid to rest at the Royal Mausoleum in Istana Besar Seri Menanti, Kuala Pilah.

Ancestry

References

Royal House of Negeri Sembilan
2016 deaths
1984 births
People from Kuala Lumpur
Malaysian Muslims
Malaysian people of Malay descent
Malaysian people of Minangkabau descent
Sons of monarchs